Maria Valeryevna Paseka (born 19 July 1995) is a Russian artistic gymnast and member of the Russia women's national gymnastics team. During her decade-long career, she has primarily been successful as a vault specialist. On this apparatus, she is a two-time Olympic medalist (silver in 2016, bronze in 2012), a two-time world champion (2015, 2017), a two-time European champion (2015, 2019), the 2015 Universiade champion, and a two-time Russian national champion (2013, 2019). As a member of the Russian teams at the 2012 and 2016 Summer Olympics, Paseka won two silver medals in the team competition.

Junior career

2010 
At the end of April, Paseka competed at the European Championships in Birmingham, United Kingdom.  She contributed an all around score of 55.850 toward the Russian team's first-place finish.  In the vault final, she won the silver medal with a score of 14.275.

Senior career

2011 
In August, Paseka competed at the Russian Cup in Yekaterinburg, Russia.  She placed third on vault scoring 13.713 and fifth on floor scoring 13.125.  Russian coach Valentina Rodionenko said, "In Yekaterinburg, she did not perform vault very well, but she has very difficult and high-level gymnastics."

In September, Paseka competed at the Artistic Gymnastics World Cup event in Ghent, Belgium.  She placed sixth on vault scoring 13.837 and fifth on floor scoring 13.175.

Later in September, Paseka competed at the Dinamo International in Penza, Russia.  She placed second on vault scoring 13.935 and third on floor scoring 14.034.

2012 
In March, Paseka competed at the Russian National Championships in Penza, Russia.  She contributed scores of 14.867 on vault, 10.767 on uneven bars, and 13.533 on floor toward the Moscow team's first-place finish.  In event finals, she placed third on vault scoring 14.120 and seventh on uneven bars scoring 11.440.

In May, Paseka competed at the European Championships in Brussels, Belgium.  She contributed a vault score of 14.833 towards the Russian team's second-place finish.

In June, Paseka competed at the Russian Cup in Penza, Russia.  She contributed scores of 15.800 on vault and 14.134 on floor toward the Moscow team's first-place finish.  In event finals, she placed seventh on vault scoring 11.925 and seventh on uneven bars scoring 13.175.

London Olympics 
At the end of July, Paseka competed at the 2012 Summer Olympics in London, United Kingdom.  In the team final, she contributed a vault score of 15.300 toward the Russian team's second-place finish.  In the vault final, she won the bronze medal with a score of 15.050.

2013
In March, Paseka competed at the Russian Championships in Penza, Russia.  She contributed scores of 15.750 on vault and 12.650 on uneven bars toward the Moscow team's second-place finish.  In event finals, she placed first on vault scoring 13.475 and eighth on uneven bars scoring 11.725.

In April, Paseka competed at the European Championships in Moscow, Russia.  She won the bronze medal in the uneven bars final with a score of 14.400. She qualified for the vault final in second place with a score of 14.733. However, in the final she fell on both her vaults and finished in 7th place with a score of 13.499.

In July, Paseka competed at the 2013 Summer Universiade in Kazan (with teammates Aliya Mustafina, Ksenia Afanasyeva, Tatiana Nabieva and Anna Dementyeva). She contributed a score of 15.100 on vault towards the Russian team's first-place finish, and in doing so, qualified first to vault finals. She won bronze in the vault final with a score of 14.950.

2015

Originally Paseka was not chosen to compete in the 2015 European Artistic Gymnastics Championships held in Montpellier, France. However, due to the injuries of Alla Sosnitskaya, Paseka was decided to be the last minute replacement for her. Paseka arrived in Montpellier after the podium training, so she started the competition without it. Nevertheless, she qualified with 14.416, the fourth highest score, into the vault final, competing a Cheng vault with a difficulty score of 6.4 as her first vault and an Amanar with a 6.3 difficulty score as her second vault. She also gained a score which would have allowed her to enter the uneven bars final (14.233); however, she gave up her place due to the two per country rule. In the vault final held on 18 April, Paseka won the gold medal with a score 15.250. This was her first European vault medal. With the victory, she defeated the defending 2-time European vault champion Giulia Steingruber.

At the 2015 World Artistic Gymnastics Championships, Paseka competed vault, uneven bars, and floor exercise for the Russian team both in qualifications and in the final, all of which she performed cleanly. Due to mistakes by her teammates on the uneven bars and balance beam, Russia narrowly missed the podium, finishing in fourth place. However, Paseka qualified for the vault finals and also earned a score which would have allowed her to compete in the uneven bars final but lost her place because of two per country rule, with Daria Spiridonova and Viktoria Komova placing above her in qualifications. In the vault final, Paseka won the gold medal, defeating the reigning world champion on vault, Hong Un-jong, who won silver. She competed a Cheng and an Amanar, as did Hong.

2016

Rio de Janeiro Olympics
At the 2016 Summer Olympics, Paseka won two silver medals: one for vault and one with the Russian team. During the team finals, she competed only on vault, successfully landing an Amanar to get the highest score for Russia on vault. In the vault finals, she did two clean vaults to clinch the silver. For her first vault she performed a Cheng, landing out of bounds, but a stuck landing boosted her score. For her second vault she performed an Amanar, taking just a step back. She was the first female gymnast since Ludmilla Tourischeva to medal on vault in two consecutive Olympic Games.

2017
Paseka did not compete at the beginning of the year so she could recover from back pains she had experienced during the Olympics. Despite having not competed at nationals or World Cup events, she was still selected to compete at the European Championships due to her prowess on vault. At the European Championships, Paseka fell short of the podium, finishing fourth on vault.

In August, Paseka was selected to represent Russia at the World Championships along with 2016 Olympic teammate Angelina Melnikova, Elena Eremina, and Anastasia Ilyankova. In qualifications, Paseka only performed on vault, where she showed a cleanly executed Cheng and a stunning Amanar despite difficulties in training. She qualified to the vault final in first place with an average score of 14.933 and then won the gold medal with a score of 14.850 in the final. She was the second Russian gymnast to win two world vault titles, and the first to do so consecutively.

In December, Paseka underwent back surgery to put one of her vertebrae back into place.

2018
Paseka spent the year recovering and rehabilitating her back.  In December she was officially medically cleared to resume training and competing.

2019
Paseka made her comeback at the 2019 Russian Artistic Gymnastics Championships where she placed first on vault after competing an Amanar and a Lopez.  As a result, she was named to the team to compete at the 2019 European Championships in Szczecin alongside Angelina Simakova, Angelina Melnikova, and Anastasia Ilyankova.  Paseka later competed at the Baku World Cup.  She qualified to the vault final in sixth place after her Lopéz was downgraded to a Podkopayeva.  In the final Paseka attempted her Cheng but fell and finished in fifth place.  At the Doha World Cup Paseka qualified to the vault final in first place after successfully competing her Cheng and Amanar.  In the vault final Paseka won silver, 0.117 points behind American Jade Carey.  Her Amanar was the highest scoring vault of the competition (15.100).

At the European Championships Paseka qualified to the vault final in fifth place after crashing her Cheng.  During the final she won gold, beating 2017 European vault champion Coline Devillard.  In June she competed at the Korea Cup where she placed fourth on vault after downgrading her Cheng to a Lopez and falling on her Amanar.  In August Paseka competed at the Russian Cup on both vault and uneven bars.  During qualifications she scored 12.100 on uneven bars but did not advance to the finals but she did qualify to vault final.  During event finals she placed fifth on vault behind Lilia Akhaimova, Melnikova, Eleonora Afanasyeva, and Viktoria Trykina after a subpar performance.

In September Paseka was named to the team to compete at the 2019 World Championships, replacing an injured Angelina Simakova.  She was later named as the alternate.  In November Paseka competed at the Cottbus World Cup where she placed sixth on vault after stepping out of bounds on her Amanar and falling while performing her Cheng.

2020
In February Paseka competed at the Melbourne World Cup where she placed eighth after falling on her Amanar and having her López downgraded.  In March she competed at the Baku World Cup but placed eleventh during qualification and did not qualify for the event final.  However event finals were canceled due to the COVID-19 pandemic in Azerbaijan.  Paseka later revealed that she injured her ankle in Baku and would therefore take a break from gymnastics and return after the 2020 Olympics.

Competitive history

International scores

See also 
 List of Olympic female gymnasts for Russia

References

External links 

 
 Maria Paseka profile 
 

1995 births
Living people
Russian female artistic gymnasts
Gymnasts at the 2012 Summer Olympics
Gymnasts at the 2016 Summer Olympics
Olympic gymnasts of Russia
Olympic medalists in gymnastics
Olympic silver medalists for Russia
Olympic bronze medalists for Russia
Medalists at the 2012 Summer Olympics
Medalists at the 2016 Summer Olympics
Medalists at the World Artistic Gymnastics Championships
World champion gymnasts
European champions in gymnastics
Universiade medalists in gymnastics
Universiade gold medalists for Russia
Universiade bronze medalists for Russia
Gymnasts from Moscow
Medalists at the 2013 Summer Universiade
Medalists at the 2015 Summer Universiade
Medalists at the 2017 Summer Universiade